The Exatron Stringy Floppy (or ESF) is a continuous-loop tape drive developed by Exatron.

History 

The company introduced an S-100 stringy floppy drive at the 1978 West Coast Computer Faire, and a version for the Radio Shack TRS-80 in 1979. Exatron sold about 4,000 TRS-80 drives by August 1981 for $249.50 each, stating that it was "our best seller by far".

Format 

There is no single catalog of files; to load a specific file the drive searches the entire tape, briefly stopping to read the header of each found file. The tape loop only moves in one direction, so a file that starts behind the current location cannot be read until the drive searches the entire loop for it. The device is capable of reading and writing random access data files (unlike a datacassette). If a record being sought has been overshot, the drive advances the tape until it loops around to the beginning and continues seeking from there.

According to Embedded Systems magazine, the Exatron Stringy Floppy uses Manchester encoding, achieving 14K read-write speeds and the code controlling the device was developed by Li-Chen Wang, who also wrote a Tiny BASIC, the basis for the TRS-80 Model I Level I BASIC.

Reception 
In the July 1983 issue of Compute!'s Gazette, the Exatron Stringy Floppy for the VIC-20 and the Commodore 64 was reviewed. Calling the peripheral "a viable alternative" to tape or disk, the magazine noted that "under ideal conditions, a Stringy Floppy can outperform a VIC-1540/1541 disk drive". Texas Instruments licensed the Stringy Floppy as the Waferdrive for its cancelled TI 99/2 computer and a Compact Computer 40 peripheral which never shipped.

Use and distribution 

The Exatron drive was initially used in the Prophet-10 music synthesizer and was later replaced with a micro-cassette drive from Braemar, reportedly due to unreliability and poor mutual compatibility of the former.

Known data capacities/tape length are: 4 kB/5 feet, 16 kB/20 feet, 48 kB/50 feet, and 64 kB/75 feet. One complete cycle through a  tape takes 55 to 65 seconds, depending on the number of files it contains.

See also 

 ZX Microdrive
 Rotronics Wafadrive

References

External links 

 Exatron Stringy Floppy as described by Bill Fletcher
 Getting Files off Stringy Floppy Wafers for use in Emulators
 Advertisements
 Exatron Official Website

Computer storage devices
Home computer peripherals
TRS-80
Computer-related introductions in 1979